Morley's Soda Water Factory is an historic building in Victoria, British Columbia, Canada.  It is one of the few industrial buildings in the Old Town District to survive the 1880s.

See also
 List of historic places in Victoria, British Columbia

References

External links
 

Buildings and structures in Victoria, British Columbia